Goupilictis minor is a prehistoric species of mammal in the family Amphicyonidae. There is only one known species in the genus Goupilictis.

Description
Goupilictis lived in the Oligocene and Miocene ages, about 28.4-5.332 million years ago. Fossils have been found in France, Germany and Ukraine.

Sources
Fossilworks: Goupilictis minor
Mammalia, Carnivora, Amphicyonidae
Goupilictis Ginsburg, 1969 - GBIF

Bear dogs
Oligocene mammals of Europe
Prehistoric carnivoran genera
Monotypic prehistoric animal genera